The National Collegiate Basketball Hall of Fame, located in Kansas City, Missouri, is a hall of fame and museum dedicated to men's college basketball.   The museum is an integral portion of the College Basketball Experience created by the National Association of Basketball Coaches (NABC), located at the T-Mobile Center. The hall is meant as a complement to the Naismith Memorial Basketball Hall of Fame, with a focus strictly on those who have contributed greatly to college basketball.

On November 17, 2006 the NABC honored around 180 players, coaches and other notable contributors to college basketball by inducting them into the founding class of the Hall of Fame.  Oscar Robertson, Bill Russell, Dean Smith, John Wooden, and the family of James Naismith, were selected to represent the inaugural class.

The Naismith Memorial Basketball Hall of Fame in Springfield, Massachusetts has indicated it will help with the exhibits.  The other interactive portions of the College Basketball Experience are called 'The Entry Experience,' 'The Fan Experience,' and 'The Game.' The NABC recently renamed the Guardians Classic college tournament the CBE Classic to help promote it.

Inductees

Each year several founding class members are honored at the induction ceremony:
 2007: Kareem Abdul-Jabbar
 2008: Charles Barkley
 2009: Larry Bird, Magic Johnson
 2010: Jerry West, David Thompson
 2011: Bob Knight, James Worthy
 2012: Clyde Lovellette, Willis Reed, Earl Monroe
 2013: Elvin Hayes

See also
USBWA Hall of Fame
National Association of Basketball Coaches (NABC)
Pac-12 Conference Men's Basketball Hall of Honor
Carolina Basketball Museum (University of North Carolina)

References

External links
 

Basketball museums and halls of fame
Bask
Bask
Sports museums in Missouri
College basketball trophies and awards in the United States
National Association of Basketball Coaches
Sports in the Kansas City metropolitan area
Awards established in 2006
2006 establishments in Missouri
Museums in Kansas City, Missouri

Downtown Kansas City